Ihar Basinski (born April 11, 1963), also spelled Igor Basinsky, is a Belarusian sports shooter and Olympic medalist. He was born in Hrodna and won silver medals in the 50 metre pistol at the 1996 and 2000 Summer Olympics.

References

External links

1963 births
Living people
Sportspeople from Grodno
Soviet male sport shooters
Belarusian male sport shooters
Shooters at the 1988 Summer Olympics
Shooters at the 1996 Summer Olympics
Shooters at the 2000 Summer Olympics
Shooters at the 2004 Summer Olympics
Olympic shooters of Belarus
Olympic bronze medalists for Belarus
Olympic silver medalists for Belarus
Olympic shooters of the Soviet Union
Olympic bronze medalists for the Soviet Union
Olympic medalists in shooting

Medalists at the 2000 Summer Olympics
Medalists at the 1996 Summer Olympics